Tabanera may refer to:

Tabanera de Cerrato, municipality located in the province of Palencia, Castile and León, Spain
Tabanera de Valdavia, municipality located in the province of Palencia, Castile and León, Spain
Tabanera la Luenga, municipality located in the province of Segovia, Castile and León, Spain